A fortune teller machine (also known as a genie machine or mechanical genie) is a type of amusement automaton, which upon receiving credit gives out a card with a prediction of the reader's future. This is typically given by an automaton. They could be found in penny arcades, and can be seen in modern video arcades and amusement parks.

Notable examples
Verbal Fortune Teller - Mills Novelty Co, c. 1904 - One unique machine, perhaps the only extant version in the world, survives in a museum in Virginia City, Montana. It features a recorded voice and eerie animatronics. "The 100-year-old fortune teller was an extremely rare find. Instead of dispensing a card like Zoltar, the Gypsy would actually speak your fortune from a hidden record player. When you dropped a penny in the slot, her eyes would flash, her teeth would chatter and her voice would come floating from a tube extending out of the eight-foot-tall box. This machine also provided fortunes for males and females separately". Reportedly, magician David Copperfield tried to buy the machine from the Montana State Historical Commission for two million dollars.

Fortune Teller Machines are a rare artifact surviving from the era of penny arcade, boardwalk and amusement parks. Listed are a few of the notable varieties:

Madame Zita - A richly attired fortune teller in Gypsy style. The electric version was manufactured around 1905 by the Roover Brothers.
Grandmothers Predictions (Cleveland Grandma) - William Gent Mfg, c. 1929 - The wise old grandmother passes her hands over the fortune telling cards and stops at the proper fortune. The card falls into the tray below.
Princess Doraldina - Doraldina Corp, c. 1928 - Her youth and beauty attract the arcade customer. The machine's lifelike movements when granting fortunes make the process appear to be alive.
Genco Gypsy Grandma Fortune Teller - Genco Mfg., New York. NY c. 1940s-1950s - The central attraction of the original boardwalk and arcades was the "Gypsy Grandma" that comes to life after depositing a coin into a slot. Once a selection is made using a rotary dial that illuminates the player's astrological sign of choice, the animated Gypsy fortune teller moves her head above a lighted crystal ball while holding a fan of playing cards in her right hand and magic wand in her left hand. Featured sophisticated movements (nods, turns her head, breathes). Her right hand picks-up a fortune card from the enclosure that she opens with her left hand. She brings the card in front of her, turns her head, and then moves the card over the cauldron and drops it (which delivers the card to the patron).
Mike Munves Grandma's Prophesies Grandma Predicts Fortune Tellers. - Mike Munves Corp., New York, c. 1930s - One hand moves over the cards while the hand moves over the crystal ball, head turns from side to side, eyes move, and the chest "breathes", crystal ball glows as the machine dispenses a fortune card.
Mike Munves Deco “Ask Grandma” Fortune Teller. - Mike Munves Corp., New York - Ask Grandma Fortune Teller, Deco. Full size Grandma, life size with human movements (chest, both hands, eyes, head). The crystal ball glows once coin is inserted. She will scan the cards for a peek into your future, and then a fortune card will drop for the patron.
Estrella's Prophecies Fortune Teller - A coin-operated Gypsy-style fortune teller machine. A full size enclosed figure in elaborate oak cabinet. Her head moves from side to side, hand moves across the cards, while her left hand raises and then she slowly dispenses a fortune card through the ornate card slot.
Zoltan Fortune Teller - Deposit 25 cent coin, put receiver in your ear, press one of twelve zodiac sign button on the front of the machine (corresponds to the 12 signs of the zodiac). The crystal ball is lit by an eerie, red mystic light when Zoltan predicts fortune. Offers 1 to 12 Zoltan's fortunes in a heavily Hungarian accent. Zoltan usually begins his fortune telling with "This is Zoltan speaking" or "Greetings from Zoltan". The predictions, which last around one minute, include things about your future, lucky numbers, and favorable colors.

Gallery
Various fortune teller machines at Musée Mécanique in San Francisco:

In media

In episode 43 "Nick of Time" of the American television anthology series The Twilight Zone. It originally aired on November 18, 1960, on CBS and was written by Richard Matheson.
In the 1988 Penny Marshall film Big, the main character, a child who wishes to be big, uses a "Zoltar" magical wishing machine very similar to a fortune teller machine that turns him into an adult. That machine was referenced in "Fortune in Flames", a second-season episode of the reality television series Pawn Stars.
In an episode of Beavis and Butt-Head, the title characters want to go to a metal concert, when Butt-Head asks Beavis for money, Beavis replies, "I spent all my money playing Zoltar."
In "The Honking", an episode of the animated TV series Futurama, the main characters, wishing to learn about a curse that has afflicted Bender, consult with a fortune teller machine, which, like many of the other machines of the 31st century, is sentient.
In the eleventh and final series of Big Brother UK and the Ultimate Big Brother series, a fortune teller machine named Bob Righter (an anagram of Big Brother), was present in the main living area of the house. In the first few weeks of the series, after an eviction, the machine would tell a good or bad fortune to one of the current housemates. However, in a twist it was actually the evicted housemate who decided who would receive the good or bad fortune.
A Zoltar machine appears on the 2014 album Wishful Thinking by the Pop-Punk band Neck Deep, and the entire album cover is reminiscent of the 1988 comedy film Big.
A fortune telling machine named "Sallah, the Soothsaying Sultan" appears in Warehouse 13, during the episode "Insatiable". Its predictions have no bearing on reality; their only purpose is to cause extreme dread in whoever reads them.
In the episode "Fundamentals of Naked Portraiture" from the series Limitless, the main character, Brian Finch, uses the Zoltar machine comically in a scene to tell some guilty military members that their fortune is that they are all murderers.
In BioShock and BioShock 2, fortune teller machines called Epstein the Swami will give out pessimistic fortunes every time they are used.
In Grand Theft Auto Online, players can opt to place a "Nazar Speaks" machine inside their arcade which will tell players fortunes when used, many of which are references to either game mechanics or other Rockstar Games video games.
In Dead by Daylight, the map "Father Campbell's Chapel" has a Zoltar machine located in the carnival section.
In Step Up 3, a Zoltar machine like the one from Big is seen when the dance crew enters the arcade at a fair.
In the music video of Poets of The Fall's "Carnival of Rust", the singer of the band is dressed as a fortune teller.
In Call of Duty: Infinite Warfares Zombies mode there is a fortune telling machine that deals "Fate and Fortune" cards.
In season 4 of Wizards of Waverly Place episode "Misfortune at the Beach", the main characters receive fortunes from a machine, good and bad, that actually come to true.
In an episode of Batman: The Animated Series, entitled "Be a Clown", the Joker uses a fortune telling machine in the form of an old woman to seal Batman's fate.
In the episode of "Mechanical Genie Island" from the series The Marvelous Misadventures of Flapjack, Flapjack and Captain K'nuckles get stranded on an island inhabited by the fortune telling machine in a form of genie that plays games with whoever comes on his island in order to cheat them into being his butlers for life. Later, it is revealed that Mechanical Genie is the toy of a giant baby. 
In Batman Forever, Edward Nygma in his apartment has the fortune telling machine in the form of a man dressed in a green suit with question marks all over it called The Guesser. Nygma took from it a major inspiration for creating the image of the Riddler.
In season 3 of Bunk'd, the campers find "The Great Balthazar", a fortune teller machine in the barn. One of the counselors, Lou, is uncomfortable with it, thinking that it's cursed. Near the end of the episode, she wants to smash it with a hammer back to "the underworld she believes that it came from" since she believes that was how the fortunes came true, until her friends give her a reasonable explanation. A camper, Matteo, tries proving it by getting a fortune saying that no one will see his true strength but when he fails to prove to her that it's just a game, another camper, Zuri, says "You didn't need to be Balthazar to see that coming".
In season 4 of Steven Universe, Steven accidentally breaks a fortune-teller machine called Zoltron at the amusement park Funland in his hometown of Beach City. As payment, the owner of Funland makes Steven dress up as Zoltron, sit in the machine, and play the role of Zoltron.
In season 2 of The Order, the Zoltar machine specifically from the film Big is seen in several episodes and said to "grant wishes ironically" inferring to the ironic wish that is granted in the film Big.
In the 1972 Peanuts animated movie Snoopy Come Home, while Charlie Brown and Peppermint Patty are at a carnival, they come across a fortune telling machine and decide to have their fortunes told. While the machine provides Peppermint Patty with a positive fortune (reading "You are a very loving person and your life will be forever filled with romance"), it provides Charlie Brown with a refusal (reading "Forget it, kid!": Charlie Brown gets a candy heart with the same words in Be My Valentine, Charlie Brown).
In the Canadian stage musical, Ride the Cyclone, the narrator of the show is Karnak, a vintage fortune telling machine who knows the exact time and place of someone's death.

See also
 Fortune-telling
 Amusement arcade
 Ka-Bala board game
 List of magic museums
 Love tester machine
 Magic 8 Ball
 Strength tester machine

References

External links

Fortune Tellers at pinballhistory.com

Commercial machines
Animatronic attractions